Merry-sur-Yonne (literally Merry on Yonne) is a commune in the Yonne Department, Bourgogne-Franche-Comté, north central France.

Les Rochers du Saussois

The Rochers du Saussois are a group of limestone cliffs situated on the right bank of the Yonne opposite and within the commune of Merry-sur-Yonne. They are a favourite location for rock-climbers.

See also
Communes of the Yonne department

References

Communes of Yonne